Zoran Babić (born 16 April 1971) is a Serbian politician. A member of the Serbian Progressive Party (SNS), he served as the leader of its parliamentary group from 2013 to 2016.

Early life 
Babić was born on 16 April 1971 in Vrnjačka Banja, SR Serbia, SFR Yugoslavia, where he finished primary and secondary school. He graduated from the Faculty of Mechanical Engineering of the University of Belgrade in 1996.

Career 
He began his career at the agricultural company "ZM produkt" in Vrnjačka Banja, where he served as marketing director.

He joined the Serbian Radical Party (SRS) in 2006, and two years later he was elected MP. Later that year he defected to the Serbian Progressive Party (SNS). After the 2012 parliamentary election, Babić was appointed deputy head of the Serbian Progressive Party parliamentary group. In 2013, he became the head of the group. He did not appear on the ballot list for the 2016 parliamentary election, and he was succeeded by Aleksandar Martinović as the head of the parliamentary group.

Personal life 
Babić has two daughters, Teodora and Julijana, and was married to Nataša Babić.

In late January 2019, he was involved in a traffic accident that occurred near Doljevac, which a woman was killed. Shortly after the incident, he resigned from his position as director of "Koridori Srbije".

References 

1971 births
Living people
Members of the National Assembly (Serbia)
Serbian Radical Party politicians
Serbian Progressive Party politicians
People from Vrnjačka Banja